Şirin Hatun (meaning "sweet") was a concubine and a consort of Sultan Bayezid II of the Ottoman Empire.

Life
Şirin entered the Bayezid's harem when he was still a prince, and the governor of Amasya. She gave birth to Bayezid's eldest daughter Aynışah Sultan in 1463 and his eldest son, Şehzade Abdullah in 1465 

According to Turkish tradition, all princes were expected to work as provincial governors as a part of their training. In 1467–68, Şirin accompanied Abdullah, when was sent to Manisa, and then to Trabzon in early 1470s. In 1480, the two returned to Manisa, and following the 1481 succession struggle to Konya.

The Sultan had granted her the village of Emakin in Mihaliç. She endowed two schools, one in Bursa, and the another in Mihaliç. She also built two mosques, one in Eynesil, and the other known as "Hatuniye Mosque" located inside Trabzon Castle in 1470. For her endowments, she allocated the villages of Kabacaağaç and Kadi in Şile, as well as four existing mills on Koca Dere Creek in Şile.

After the death of Şehzade Abdullah in 1483, Şirin retired to Bursa. In retirement, she built a tomb for Abdullah, in which she and her daughter were too buried at their death.

Issue
From Bayezid II, Şirin had a daughter and a son:
Aynışah Sultan (Amasya,  1463 - Bursa,  1514). She married Ahmed Bey in 1490 and had with him two daughters, Hanzade Hanimsultan and Neslihan Hanimsultan, and a son, Sultanzade Zeyneddin Bey. She was buried in Bursa with her mother and brother.
Şehzade Abdullah (Amasya; 1465 - Konya; 11 June 1483). Bayezid's first son, he died of unknown causes and was buried in Bursa. He took as consort his cousin Nergiszade Ferahşad Sultan (daughter of Şehzade Mustafa, son of Mehmed II), with whom he had a son who died in infancy (1481-1489) and two daughters, Aynişah Sultan (b. 1482, married) and Şahnisa Sultan (b. 1484, she married her cousin Şehzade Mehmed Şah, son of Şehzade Şehinşah).

References

Sources

Sirin
Year of birth unknown
Year of death unknown
16th-century consorts of Ottoman sultans